Barasat Peary Charan Sarkar Government High School in Barasat (a suburb of Kolkata in the state of West Bengal, India) is a boys school. The school was established in 1846 by Ishwar Chandra Vidyasagar, Peary Charan Sarkar, and others. The original and most popular name of the school was Barasat Government High School.

See also
Peary Charan SarkarBarasat Kalikrishna Girls' High School

References

Schools in Colonial India
Boys' schools in India
Primary schools in West Bengal
High schools and secondary schools in West Bengal
Schools in North 24 Parganas district
Barasat
Educational institutions established in 1846
1846 establishments in British India